Findhorn railway station formerly served Findhorn in Moray, Scotland.

History
The station was opened by the Findhorn Railway on 18 April 1860.

On 28 January 1861, James Grant, guard, was endeavouring to loosen the connecting screws between two carriages. The engine driver backed up to relieve the strain, and Grant got his arm trapped between the buffers and was hospitalised.

The station closed to passengers on 31 January 1869. Freight services to the station continued on an irregular basis for around another 10 years.

See also 
 List of closed railway stations in Britain

References

External links
 Disused stations

Disused railway stations in Sutherland
Former Highland Railway stations
Railway stations in Great Britain opened in 1860
Railway stations in Great Britain closed in 1869
Findhorn